"Over You" is a song by Australian electronic music group Safia. It was released as the third single alongside the pre-order of their forthcoming debut studio album, Internal (2016). The track was premiered on the Triple J breakfast show on 30 June  and sees the group muse over a past love.

Music video
The music video for "Over You" was released on YouTube on 17 August 2016. It was directed by Markus Hofko. It is the first Safia video not to be directed by an Australian.
The clip focuses on the haunting effects that a breakup can bring, when you still feel the other person’s presence long after they’ve left your life, the surreal and at times eerie clip is a beautifully shot glimpse into the desperation of needing to get over someone.

Critical reception
Nick Kelly from Project U described the song as "a big ball of stomping fun."

Charts
In Australia, "Over You" debuted at number 80 on the ARIA singles chart for the week commencing 11 July 2016, peaking at number 63 the following week.

Weekly charts

References

Safia (band) songs
2016 singles
2016 songs
Parlophone singles